Abundance: The Future Is Better Than You Think is a non-fiction book on advancing the human condition authored by Peter H. Diamandis and Steven Kotler that was published in 2012. Diamandis is otherwise primarily known for founding the X Prize Foundation, a nonprofit effort based around scientific competitions, and Kotler is otherwise known both as a journalist and as a writer of previous works.

The writers refer to the work's title as signifying a future in which nine billion people have access to clean water, food, energy, health care, housing, education, and everything else that is necessary for fully meaningful standard of living, this occurring due to rapid developments in technological innovation causing economic progress during the decades of the 2010s and 2020s.

Reviews and commentary
Time wrote of the book's message: "[T]he future is going to be better than you think. [...] That might be hard to believe given the constant stream of dread that is the daily news— and the endless well of fear that seems to be the future— but a close look at the numbers indicates that things are better than we believe."

Christian Science Monitor published a praising review that remarked the authors had written "a book that values your intelligence by being honest and shooting straight."

The Washington Post said the book is, "a heavy dose of optimism... The authors make a persuasive case that mankind’s future may not be as bleak as we fear..."

The San Francisco Chronicle said that the book's authors "argue forcefully against two prevailing notions: that the world's resources are being depleted too rapidly, and that the gap between the rich and the poor is widening beyond repair. They cite the rise of do-it-yourself innovation, fabulously rich 'technophilanthropists' who intend to use their deep pockets to change the world, and what they've termed the 'rising billion': the world's poor, who, thanks to modern communication technology, now have a voice."

The Wall St. Journal wrote, "Diamandis and Kotler think that individual innovators can and will make huge differences to human living standards...  Take Iqbal Quadir, who quit his job as a venture capitalist in New York to start a cellphone company in his native Bangladesh, at a time when cellphones cost nearly twice the annual income of the average Bangladeshi. He had the foresight to bet on falling costs and the usefulness of the new technology for the long-isolated rural poor."

See also

2012 in literature
Futurology
Technological innovation

References

2012 books
Economics books
Environmental non-fiction books
Free Press (publisher) books
Technology books